AXS TV Fights is the brand name of AXS TV's live mixed martial arts (MMA), Muay Thai and kickboxing broadcasts. Formerly known as HDNET Fights, the program's name was changed to AXS TV Fights in July 2012, following the network's rebrand  from HDNET to AXS TV.

History

Origins as HDNET Fights
HDNet Fights was founded in 2007 by billionaire entrepreneur Mark Cuban, owner and founder of HDNet, as a programming cornerstone to build the new network on. Cuban's goal was to present MMA in a manner more in line with other professional sports, while eliminating ancillary details such as ring card girls. Taking a hands-on approach in the business and promotion of MMA, Cuban became one of the sport's most vocal defenders in his blogs and interviews. HDNet Fights hosted its first self-promoted event on October 13, 2007, featuring a light-heavyweight main event contest between Erik Paulson and Jeff Ford.  The program's second and final event, Reckless Abandon, was held two months later. Realizing that the company's strength did not lie in hosting fight cards, Cuban re-vamped the HDNet Fights concept, as HDNet began broadcasting live weekly events from other organizations, including many top regional fight promotions.

After acquiring the rights to air Japanese Fighting and Entertainment Group's MMA promotion Dream in the United States for the first time ever, HDNet premiered a repeat of the Dream 1 event on May 2, 2008. A repeat of Dream 2 aired the following day, and Dream 3 aired live on May 11. On February 6, 2009, HDNet announced they had reached an agreement with another Japanese MMA promotion, and competitor to Dream, World Victory Road. The promotion made its United States debut with a broadcast of its "Sengoku" events, opening with World Victory Road'''s first event of 2009 on March 20.

Under the HDNet Fights banner, the network's broadcast lineup included DREAM, Sengoku, K-1 and K-1 Max, Strikeforce, Adrenaline MMA, SportFight, Ring of Fire, Ring of Combat, M-1 Global, Ring of Honor, Maximum Fighting Championship, Affliction Entertainment, Urban Conflict Championship and the now-defunct IFL, among others.

As AXS TV Fights
Since its regeneration as AXS TV Fights, the program has become a major fixture in AXS TVs Friday night programming line-up, with the network airing over 40 live events per year. The AXS TV Fights broadcast lineup has featured events from promotions including BAMMA (USA), Legacy Fighting Championship, Lion Fight Muay Thai, Maximum Fighting Championship, Resurrection Fighting Alliance, Titan Fighting Championships, and Xtreme Fighting Championships. In August 2014, the network announced a multi-year deal with CES MMA. The following January, the network joined forces with Legacy Fighting Championship, airing the promotion’s first-ever kickboxing event on January 16, 2015.

On March 14, 2014 AXS TV Fights aired the North American premiere of the Russian Hip Show: Arena Combat. A two-on-two, points-based fighting event on a padded obstacle course instead of a traditional ring or cage. The pilot episode was a two-hour "best of" special, featuring lightweight and middleweight tournaments from 2012. English commentary was provided by Cyrus Fees and Casey Oxendine.

AXS TV Fights''' presentation of LION FIGHT 16 on July 4, 2014, was the network's historic 250th fight broadcast.

On March 21, 2015, AXS TV Fights announced it would hold its first ever co-promoted mixed martial arts event featuring fighters from Resurrection Fighting Alliance (RFA) and Legacy Fighting Championship (Legacy) May 8, 2015. The event, titled "AXS TV Fights: RFA vs. Legacy Superfight" included a headlining fight between RFA Flyweight Champion Alexandre Pantoja and Legacy Flyweight Champion Damacio Page, two co-main events featuring intra-organizational title fights for each promotion, and three fights between RFA and Legacy contenders on the main card.

AXS TV Fights broadcast its 300th combat sports event on October 23, 2016, with Lion Fight 25.

On Sept. 19, 2016, RFA president Ed Soares appeared on "The MMA Hour" to announce the merger of Resurrection Fighting Alliance and Legacy Fighting Championship to become Legacy Fighting Alliance beginning in 2017. The newly announced promotion also signed a multi-year deal with AXS TV Fights.

The network celebrated its 400th live event broadcast with LFA 40 on May 25, 2018

On September 13, 2019, was announced the end of the partnership between AXS TV and LFA.

On November 6, 2019, AXS TV and the MMA organization Combate Americas announced broadcast deal for 35 events in 2020.

Fight commentatorsAXS TV Fights commentary team included UFC Hall of Famer Pat Miletich and sports broadcaster and reporter Ron Kruck, with media personality Phoenix Carnevale reporting cageside.

Sports broadcaster "The Voice" Michael Schiavello was the play-by-play commentator from 2009 to 2017. In May 2017 Schiavello announced his last event with AXS TV Fights would be Legacy Fighting Alliance 13 in Burbank, CA.

From 2010 to 2016, Schiavello also conducted in-depth interviews with combat sports stars on The Voice Versus, which aired intermittently in primetime.

List of AXS TV Fights promotions

Current promotions
AXS TV Fights currently broadcasts events from the following promotions:
 Invicta Fighting Championships

Past promotions
AXS TV Fights
AXS TV Fights has previously broadcast events from the following promotions:
 BAMMA
 Championship Fighting Alliance
 CES MMA
 Legacy Kickboxing
Lion Fight Muay Thai
 Legacy Fighting Alliance
 Maximum Fighting Championship
 New Japan Pro-Wrestling 
 Resurrection Fighting Alliance
 Titan Fighting Championships
 Xtreme Fighting Championships

HDNET Fights
Under the HDNET Fights banner, the network broadcast fights from the following promotions:
 Adrenaline MMA
 Affliction Entertainment
 DREAM
 International Fight League
 K-1
 K1 Max
 M-1 Global
 Maximum Fighting Championship
 Ring of Combat
 Ring of Fire MMA
 Ring of Honor
 Sengoku
 SportFight
 Strikeforce
 Urban Conflict Championship

AXS TV Fight events

References

External links
  AXS TV Fights Homepage 

Mixed martial arts television shows
2007 American television series debuts